Le Roi et le batelier (The King and the oarsman) is a one-act opéra comique by Fromental Halévy and Victor Rifaut, to a libretto by Saint-Georges. It was first performed on 8 November 1827 at the Opéra Comique in Paris.

Background
Le Roi et le batelier was the second of Halévy's operatic works to receive public performance. The music was written in collaboration with Victor Rifaut, who had won the Prix de Rome in 1821, two years after Halévy himself. The premiere took place on the birthday of King Charles X, and some flattering comparison of the King to the opera's hero Henri IV was obviously intended. The opera had thirteen performances, and has apparently never been revived.

A review of the original production in the English music journal The Harmonicon noted that the opera:
can boast of a number of pieces of interest, particularly the introduction, a quartet, a trio, a chorus of prisoners, and a delightful duet, excellently given by Ferréol and Mademoiselle Pradher.

Roles

Synopsis
Time: 1594:
Place: Paris.

Henri IV seeks to capture Paris without resort to battle. In disguise as a Parisian soldier, he gets the oarsman Claude to ferry him across the river Seine. Pretending to smuggle supplies into the besieged city, the 'soldier' leads a convoy which in fact contains his army; Paris is thus taken peacefully and the citizens rejoice at the success of the King.

References
Notes

Sources
 Jordan, Ruth (1994). Fromental Halévy: His Life and Music.  London: Kahn and Averill  (p. 29)

Operas
1827 operas
Operas by Fromental Halévy
Opéras comiques
Operas set in Paris
French-language operas
Opera world premieres at the Opéra-Comique